English Garden may refer to:
 Gardens in England
 English landscape garden
 Englischer Garten, a park in Munich, Bavaria
 English Garden, a park in Palermo, Sicily
 English Garden (album), an album by Bruce Woolley and The Camera Club, or the title song
 "English Garden" (Ringo Starr song)